Teapa Municipality is a municipality in Tabasco in south-eastern Mexico.  Its name comes from the Nahuatl words "Tetl and apan", which mean "river over stones" or "stone's river". It refers to one of the rivers that crosses the town.

The municipal seat is Teapa city, and possess a division constituted by 18 ejidos, 15 ranches, 1 populated, 6 neighborhoods and 1 villa. There is a border to the north with the municipalities of Centro and Jalapa; and in the south, east and west with the state of Chiapas. According to the results presented for the 2nd population and home count from 2005, the municipality has a population of 49,262 people.

Climate
The monthly highest average is in June from and the lowest average is in December.

Notable people
 Luis Arenal Bastar, artist

References

Municipalities of Tabasco
Populated places in Tabasco